The Woman With Four Faces is a lost 1923 American silent crime melodrama film directed by Herbert Brenon and starring Betty Compson. Famous Players-Lasky produced while Paramount Pictures released. The story is based on a play (possibly unproduced), The Woman With Four Faces, by Bayard Veiller.

Plot
As described in a film magazine review, Elizabeth West, a young woman who is both a thief and a con artist and allied with a gang of crooks, is freed when a jury does not convict her on a larceny charge. She determines to aid district attorney Richard Templar to round up a gang of narcotic traffickers. Disguised as an old woman, she secures the privilege of having an old confederate, who is in solitary confinement, temporarily released to aid in the plan. He turns against her, however, and she is forced to work alone with the district attorney. They succeed in their plan and then confess their love for each other.

Cast

References

External links

Advertisement
Lobby card

1924 films
American silent feature films
Lost American films
Films directed by Herbert Brenon
American films based on plays
Paramount Pictures films
American crime drama films
American black-and-white films
1920s crime drama films
Melodrama films
1923 drama films
1923 films
1924 drama films
1920s American films
Silent American drama films
1920s English-language films